The Orenburg electoral district was a constituency created for the 1917 Russian Constituent Assembly election.

The electoral district covered the Orenburg Governorate. Initially eleven seats were allocated to the Orenburg district, but a decree from the Provisional Government issued on October 27, 1917 increased the number of seats to 12.

According to U.S. historian Oliver Henry Radkey, who is the source for the results table below, his account of the Bashkir Federalist vote is underestimated, believing that the real figure would have landed at around 100,000.

Results

References

Electoral districts of the Russian Constituent Assembly election, 1917